Lepidosperma amantiferrum is a sedge of the family Cyperaceae that is endemic to Western Australia. It has no synonyms.

Its leaves and culms are distichous (i.e., arranged in two rows on opposite sides of a stem and in the same plane).
In Western Australia it is found in the IBRA Mallee biogeographic region where it grows in yellow sandy loam with banded ironstone gravel and rocks on gentle lower slopes.

References

Plants described in 2007
Flora of Western Australia
amantiferrum
Taxa named by Russell Lindsay Barrett